Rajya Sabha elections were held in 1996, to elect members of the Rajya Sabha, Indian Parliament's upper house. 59 members from 17 states, 1 member from Mizoram State, and 15 members from 3 states of JK, UK and UP were elected.

Elections
Elections were held in 1996 to elect members from various states.
The list is incomplete.

Members elected
The following members are elected in the elections held in 1996. They are members for the term 1996-2002 and retire in year 2002, except in case of the resignation or death before the term.

State - Member - Party

Bye-elections
The following bye elections were held in the year 1996.

State - Member - Party

 HR - K L Poswal - INC (  ele  13/02/1996 term till 1998 ) 
 MH - Prof Ram Kapse - BJP (  ele  27/09/1996 term till 1998 ) 
 MH - Sanjay Nirupam - SS (  ele  27/09/1996 term till 2000 ) 
 UP - Dara_Singh_Chauhan - BSP (  ele  30/11/1996 term till 2000 ) res of Mayawati
 UP - Khan Ghufran Zahidi  - INC (  ele  30/11/1996 term till 1998 )
 UP - Ahmad Wasim - INC (  ele  30/11/1996 term till 1998 ) 
 Tamil Nadu - V.K. Duraisamy - DMK (  ele  26/11/1996 term till 2001 ) res of V.K. Duraisamy fr AIADMK
 GJ - Yoginder K Alagh - IND (  ele  26/11/1996 term till 2000 ) res of

References

1996 elections in India
1996